Aeoloplides turnbulli, known generally as thistle grasshopper, is a species of spur-throated grasshopper in the family Acrididae. Other common names include the Russian thistle grasshopper and saltbush grasshopper. It is found in North America.

Subspecies
These two subspecies belong to the species Aeoloplides turnbulli:
 Aeoloplides turnbulli bruneri (Caudell, 1907) i c g
 Aeoloplides turnbulli turnbulli (Thomas, 1872) i c g
Data sources: i = ITIS, c = Catalogue of Life, g = GBIF, b = Bugguide.net

References

External links

 

Melanoplinae
Articles created by Qbugbot
Insects described in 1872